Anatoliy Trozhenkov (sometimes listed as Anatoly Troshenkov, 1930–1999) was a Soviet sprint canoer who competed in the 1950s. He won a bronze medal in the K-4 1000 m event at the 1958 ICF Canoe Sprint World Championships in Prague.

Trozhenkov also competed at the 1952 Summer Olympics in Helsinki in the K-2 1000 m event, but was eliminated in the heats.

References

1930 births
1999 deaths
Canoeists at the 1952 Summer Olympics
Soviet male canoeists
Olympic canoeists of the Soviet Union
Russian male canoeists
ICF Canoe Sprint World Championships medalists in kayak